Ann Carr may refer to:
 Ann Carr (gymnast)
 Ann Carr (evangelist)

See also
 Ann Carr-Boyd, Australian classical composer and musicologist
 Anne Carr, Catholic nun and feminist theologian